Michael Vanderbyl (born February 9, 1947) is a multidisciplinary designer and design educator based in the San Francisco Bay Area, and the principal of Vanderbyl Design.

Biography 
Michael Vanderbyl was born February 9, 1947, in Oakland, California. Vanderbyl received a Bachelor of Fine Arts degree in Graphic Design in 1968 from California College of the Arts (CCA). He taught graphic design at CCA for more than 30 years, from 1973 to 2014 and served as the Dean of Design from 1986 to 2002.

Vanderbyl was one of the artists in the early 1980s that helped establish the San Francisco Bay Area as a center of the postmodern movement in graphic design. In the early 1980s a few San Francisco–based designers were nicknamed “The Michaels” because they all had the same name (Vanderbyl alongside, Cronan, Mabry, Manwaring, Schwab), and later they were known as the "Pacific Wave" according to historian Steven Heller.

In 1973, he established his own practice, Vanderbyl Design. Over the years his work has expanded from graphic design to designing furniture, products, showrooms and retail spaces. Clients have included Esprit, Baker Furniture, The Walt Disney Company, IBM, AmericaOne, Robert Talbott, Teknion, The Blackstone Group and Luna Textiles. He has designed products for, among others, McGuire Furniture, and HBF. 

Vanderbyl was awarded the 2000 AIGA Medal by the American Institute of Graphic Arts (AIGA). He has been a member of the Alliance Graphique Internationale (AGI) since 1987. He was the recipient of a Lifetime Achievement Award from the International Interior Design Association (IIDA) in 2006. In 2012, he was inducted into the Interior Design Hall of Fame.

See also 
 List of AIGA medalists

References

Further reading 
 

AIGA medalists
American graphic designers
California College of the Arts alumni
1947 births
Living people
People from Oakland, California
Businesspeople from San Francisco